Kay Avonne Orr (née Stark; January 2, 1939) is an American politician who served as the 36th governor of Nebraska from 1987 to 1991. A member of the Republican Party, she was the state's first and to date only female governor.

Early life and education
Orr was born Kay Avonne Stark in Burlington, Iowa. Her mother, Sadie, was active in local politics, while her father, Ralph, was a Burlington city council member and farm implements dealer. She attended the University of Iowa from 1956 to 1957.

Career 
In 1963, Orr began volunteering for the Republican Party. She supported such politicians as Richard Nixon, Carl Curtis, and Roman Hruska, and was named Nebraska's Outstanding Young Republican Woman in 1969. 
 
Orr was appointed as Nebraska State Treasurer following the midterm resignation of Frank Marsh in 1981. She was subsequently elected to that post in 1982, becoming the first woman ever to be elected to a statewide constitutional office in Nebraska. She held that office until 1987.

Nebraska governor 
In the 1986 election, Orr secured the Republican nomination for Nebraska governor after winning an eight-way primary, carrying 81 of Nebraska's 93 counties including Douglas and Lancaster, Brashear carried 9 counties, and Hoch carried 2 counties.

In the 1986 general election, she defeated former Lincoln Mayor Helen Boosalis in the first U.S. gubernatorial election in which both major party candidates were women, winning by a 53% to 47% margin. Orr was the first Republican woman elected governor in the United States, and the second Republican woman governor after Vesta M. Roy, who served as the unelected acting governor of New Hampshire from December 1982 to January 1983.

In the 1990 gubernatorial election, Orr was narrowly defeated by Democrat Ben Nelson. Nelson's two main attacks on her gubernatorial record were her support of a proposed low-level nuclear waste dump, and a tax increase was passed over her veto.

Politics
As governor, Orr was against tax increases, against the Equal Rights Amendment, and opposes abortions in all cases.

Later career 
Orr co-chaired a coalition seeking to prohibit gay marriage in the state constitution via Initiative 416. Her effort was successful, and gay marriage was banned in 2000. In 2015, the Obergefell v. Hodges Supreme Court ruling rendered the ban unenforceable.

Orr served twice as a presidential elector for the state of Nebraska, casting one of the state's five electoral votes. In the 2004 presidential election, she voted for George W. Bush, and in the 2012 election, for Mitt Romney.

Personal life 
She married William Dayton Orr on September 26, 1957, and they had two children, John William and Suzanne. She moved with her family to Lincoln, Nebraska, in 1963.

Her husband, Bill Orr, died from complications of COPD on May 5, 2013.

See also
List of female governors in the United States

References

External links
 
 at the Nebraska State Historical Society
National Governors Association
 

|-

|-

|-

|-

1939 births
20th-century American politicians
20th-century American women politicians
Republican Party governors of Nebraska
Living people
Politicians from Lincoln, Nebraska
Politicians from Burlington, Iowa
State treasurers of Nebraska
2004 United States presidential electors
2012 United States presidential electors
Women in Nebraska politics
Women state governors of the United States
21st-century American women politicians